Incheh-ye Olya may refer to:
 Incheh-ye Olya, North Khorasan
 Incheh-ye Olya, West Azerbaijan
 Incheh-ye Olya, Maku, West Azerbaijan Province
 Incheh-ye Olya, Zanjan